The Beach Chalet is a historic two-story Spanish Colonial Revival-style building, located at the far western end of Golden Gate Park in San Francisco. The building is owned by the San Francisco Recreation & Parks Department; and the tenants are the Beach Chalet Brewery and Restaurant, and the Park Chalet.  

The building is listed as a San Francisco Designated Landmark since February 22, 1985; and listed in the National Register of Historic Places, since July 22, 1981.

History
The building was designed by architect Willis Polk, and opened in 1925 as a city-run restaurant and included changing rooms for beach visitors.  The Beach Chalet is located near the Dutch Windmill in Golden Gate Park. It replaced an older building called the Golden Gate Park Chalet, built in 1892, that had stood on the opposite side of the Great Highway.

Derelict 
The building was taken over by the United States Army as a coastal defense headquarters during World War II. After the war, the city leased the Beach Chalet to the Veterans of Foreign Wars (VFW) for $50 a month. The VFW moved out after the city bumped the rent to $500 a month in 1979.

The location, remote from downtown San Francisco, drew complaints regarding "rotten performances and nauseating spectacles". A "smoker" party held there in 1952 featured gambling, strippers and lewd films; Salvatore (Tarbaby) Terrano of the Waxey Gordon narcotics ring was arrested following the event. After the VFW moved out, the derelict Beach Chalet was occupied by homeless people and cats and nearly was destroyed by fire before a padlocked fence was erected.

Restaurant 
After several years of closure and following a renovation completed in 1996, the building now houses the Beach Chalet Brewery and Restaurant on the second floor, opened by Lara and Gar Truppelli and Timon Malloy. Its sister restaurant, the Park Chalet, is located to the back of the Beach Chalet with a dining room facing the park and outdoor dining on a terrace and lawn area.

Art

The Beach Chalet has three major works of art added in 1936 and 1937 as Works Progress Administration (WPA) projects 
 San Francisco Life, a major mural by Lucien Labaudt at the entrance hall; Labaudt also painted monochrome frescoes in the stairwell and restroom hallway.
 Sea Creatures, a series of carved magnolia wood panels for the staircase by Michael von Meyer
 Mosaics designed by Labaudt and executed by Primo Caredio

San Francisco Life mural 

Lucien Labaudt painted the elaborate San Francisco Life fresco mural in 1936 and 1937. It depicts real people and scenes from San Francisco in the 1930s, encompassing the beach, Golden Gate Park, Fisherman's Wharf, and the Marina District. Many of the figures depicted are artists, patrons, and WPA administrators that Labaudt knew; unlike the more radical murals at Coit Tower, art history professor Anthony Lee wrote "The Beach Chalet only confirmed [Labaudt's] return to the fold. Its rigorous symmetry and compositional concision, its playful but unabashed kowtowing, its scenes of relaxed pleasure and unproblematic display of the city's entertainment spots, its purposeful omission of any Artists' Union painters — all these run counter to the visual language of his Coit Tower mural." There are four quotations from local poets painted over each doorway.

In 1981, Restoration Associates pledged to restore the mural as part of a thirty-year lease on the property. The mural room is now the San Francisco Visitor's Center. The Beach Chalet murals appear in the Michael Apted film, Class Action (1991).

See also 
 List of San Francisco Designated Landmarks
 National Register of Historic Places listings in San Francisco

References

External links

 Official website

Golden Gate Park
Art in San Francisco
Restaurants in San Francisco
1925 establishments in California
Buildings and structures completed in 1925
National Register of Historic Places in San Francisco
Public art in California